James Nicholas Slater (21 February 1884 – 30 July 1970) was an Australian rules footballer who played with Carlton in the Victorian Football League (VFL).

Slater was recruited to Carlton from Milawa FC in the Ovens & King Football League.

Slater made his debut against Geelong at Princes Park in round five, 1905.

Slater later returned to play with Milawa and played in their losing 1907 Ovens & King Football League grand final side.

Notes

External links 

Jim Slater's profile at Blueseum

1884 births
Australian rules footballers from Victoria (Australia)
Carlton Football Club players
1970 deaths
Australian rules footballers from Queensland